Modiano (founded before 1884) is an Italian brand of playing cards. The company was founded by Saul Modiano in Trieste and initially manufactured cigarette papers.  In 1884 it diversified into lithographic printing, including playing cards.  In 1987 the company was taken over by the Grafad group, though the Modiano brand is still in use for playing cards and games equipment.

In the 1930s Modiano's advertising posters were created by artists including Sándor Bortnyik and these are now reproduced for sale.

References

External links

 Includes images of many Modiano posters

Manufacturing companies based in Trieste
Playing card manufacturers
Cigarette rolling papers